The -11223 Utah State Aggies football team was an American football team that represented Utah State University as an independent during the 1973 NCAA Division I football season. In their eightgh season under head coach Phil Krueger, the Aggies compiled a 7–4 record and were outscored by opponents by a total of 230 to 202.

The team's statistical leaders included Tom Wilson with 1,177 passing yards, Archie Gibson with 1,150 rushing yards, Craig Clark with 495 receiving yards, Jerry Cox with 60 points scored, and Brian Longuevan with 80 total tackles.

Schedule

References

Utah State
Utah State Aggies football seasons
Utah State Aggies football